Below are the squads for the Football at the 2007 All-Africa Games, hosted by Algiers, Algeria, and which took place between 10 and 23 July 2007.

Group A

Cameroon

Ghana

South Africa

Tunisia

Group B

Algeria
Head coach: Mahmoud Guendouz

Egypt

Guinea

Zambia

External links
Football VIII All Africa Games - Abuja 2007 - todor66.com

Squads
2007